Vijay Dandekar (born 28 September 1933) is an Indian cricketer. He played in twenty-four first-class matches for Uttar Pradesh from 1955/56 to 1967/68.

See also
 List of Uttar Pradesh cricketers

References

External links
 

1933 births
Living people
Indian cricketers
Uttar Pradesh cricketers
Cricketers from Indore